Juliet Rainer Kafiire is a Ugandan politician and legislator who represented Kibuku County in Pallisa between 1994 to 2006. She also served as the Deputy President General of Uganda's Democratic Party (DP).

Career 
During Uganda's 1994 Ugandan Constituent Assembly election, Kafiire was elected as the delegate to represent Pallisa As a member of the National Caucus for Democracy (NCD), Kafiire was one of the fifty three Constituent Assembly Delegates who refused to endorse the 1995 constitution 

Kafiire represented Kibuku County in Uganda's Parliament between 1996 to 2006. She eventually lost this position in the 2006 General Elections to Saleh Kamba who was affiliated to the National Resistance Movement (NRM)

In November 2005, Kafiire was elected as the Deputy President General of Uganda's Democratic Party (DP)

Personal life 
Kafiire was married to Joseph Rainer, a German national who died in 2007.

See also 

 Democratic Party (Uganda)
 Saleh Kamba
 Pallisa district

References 

Living people
Ugandan women
Members of the Parliament of Uganda
Ugandan women by occupation
20th-century Ugandan women
20th-century Ugandan women politicians
20th-century Ugandan politicians
21st-century Ugandan women
21st-century Ugandan women politicians
21st-century Ugandan politicians
Democratic Party (Uganda) politicians
Leaders of political parties in Uganda
Year of birth missing (living people)